Central Zone may refer to:

Places
 Central Indo-Aryan languages, or the "Central Zone" of Indo-Aryan, a language group of India
 Central Zone, Bhutan, an administrative district of Bhutan
 Central Zone of São Paulo, an administrative zone of the city of São Paulo, Brazil
 Central Zone of the Town of Angra do Heroismo in the Azores, a UNESCO World Heritage Site
 Central Zone, Tigray, Ethiopia

Sports
 Central Zone cricket team, central India
 Central Zone cricket team (Bangladesh)
 Central Zone cricket team (Pakistan)
 Central Zone women's cricket team, central India

See also
 Central Railway zone, a zone of Indian Railways, headquartered in Mumbai
 Central Time Zone